Folly Beach is a public city on Folly Island in Charleston County, South Carolina, United States. The population was 2,617 at the 2010 census, up from 2,116 in 2000. Folly Beach is within the Charleston-North Charleston-Summerville metropolitan area and the Charleston-North Charleston Urbanized Areas.

History
The Folly North Site (38CH1213) and Secessionville Historic District are listed on the National Register of Historic Places.

Geography

Known to Charleston locals as "the Edge of America", Folly Beach is home to numerous surf spots, the most popular being the Washout, 10th Street and the Folly Beach Pier. Despite its usually calm conditions, Folly Beach has gained prominence as one of the more popular surf spots along the East Coast. Folly Beach is an eclectic beach community with surf shops, restaurants, gift shops, offices, and bars along Center Street; the main road and gateway to the community.

Endangered North Atlantic right whales, the state animal of Georgia and South Carolina, migrate along the coast during the migration seasons.

Demographics

2020 census

As of the 2020 United States census, there were 2,078 people, 1,401 households, and 716 families residing in the city.

2019
As of the census of 2019, there were 2,660 people, 1,060 households, and 489 families residing in the city. The population density was 172.7 people per square mile (66.6/km2). There were 1,747 housing units at an average density of 142.5 per square mile (55.0/km2). The racial makeup of the city was 96.6% White, 0.8% African American, 0.5% Native American, 0.2% Asian, 0.5% from other races, and 1.4% from two or more races. Hispanic or Latino of any race were 1.4% of the population.

There were 1,060 households, out of which 13.0% had children under the age of 18 living with them, 38.0% were married couples living together, 4.9% had a female householder with no husband present,  and 53.8% were non-families. 33.6% of all households were made up of individuals, and 6.3% had someone living alone who was 65 years of age or older. The average household size was 2.00 and the average family size was 2.51.

In the city, the age distribution of the population shows 10.9% under the age of 18, 13.6% from 18 to 24, 33.5% from 25 to 44, 29.6% from 45 to 64, and 12.4% who were 65 years of age or older. The median age was 41 years. For every 100 females, there were 104.2 males. For every 100 females age 18 and over, there were 104.6 males.

The median income for a household in the city was $46,935, and the median income for a family was $66,058. Males had a median income of $76,014 versus $33,450 for females. The per capita income for the city was $30,493. About 4.6% of families and 12.5% of the population were below the poverty line, including 8.7% of those under age 18 and 2.5% of those age 65 or over.

Government 
The city is run by an elected strong mayor-council government system.

Mayor
Tim Goodwin

Council members
DJ Rich, Amy Ray, Katherine Houghton, E.D., William Farley, Billy Grooms, and Adam Barker

Voting patterns
In 2006, the city's residents voted against Amendment 1, which sought to ban same-sex marriage in South Carolina. Statewide, the measure passed by 78% to 22% but the voters of Folly Beach rejected it by 503 votes (49%) to 528 (51%).

County parks 
The Charleston County Park and Recreation Commission (CCPRC) operates numerous facilities in Charleston County. In Folly Beach, the county operates Folly Beach County Park and Folly Beach Fishing Pier.

References

External links

 City of Folly Beach official website
 Folly Beach
 Photos of Folly Beach
 Charleston County Park and Recreation Commission

Cities in South Carolina
Cities in Charleston County, South Carolina
Charleston–North Charleston–Summerville metropolitan area
Populated coastal places in South Carolina
1938 establishments in South Carolina